The International Union of Microbiological Societies (IUMS), founded in 1927 as the International Society of Microbiology, is one of 40 member unions and associations of the International Science Council (ISC), and was formerly under ISC's predecessor, the International Council for Science.

The union's objectives are to promote the study of microbiological sciences internationally: initiate, facilitate and coordinate research and other scientific activities which involve international cooperation; ensure the discussion and dissemination of the results of international conferences, symposia and meetings and assist in the publication of their reports; represent microbiological sciences in ISC and maintain contact with other international organizations.

IUMS activities include the classification and nomenclature of bacteria, fungi and viruses, food microbiology, medical microbiology and diagnostics, culture collections, education, and biological standardization.

The president-elect of IUMS is Professor Eliora Ron of Tel Aviv University.

Organization
The IUMS has three divisions:
 Bacteriology and Applied Microbiology (BAM)
 Mycology
 Virology

These divisions each have their own set of officers and objectives.  Each division is responsible for the organization of their own International Congresses. They work together toward the goal of furthering microbiology research and communication globally. 
In addition to the three divisions, the IUMS also conducts scientific activities through the following:
 Specialist international committees (3)
 International commissions (6)
 International federations (2).

The Virology Division governs the International Committee on Taxonomy of Viruses, which is responsible for the naming of new viruses.

References

External links
 IUMS website

Members of the International Council for Science
Biology societies
Scientific supraorganizations
Members of the International Science Council